Ahiri may refer to either of the following Indo-Aryan language varieties of India:
Ahīrī, a Bhili dialect spoken in Kutch, Gujarat
Ahīrī or Ahirī, another name for the Malvi language of Uttar Pradesh and Madhya Pradesh

See also 
 Ahirani language, also known as Khandeshi, spoken in Maharashtra
 Ahirwati dialect, spoken in south Haryana and north Rajasthan

Bibliography 

Languages of India
Language naming